The Human Abstract is the self-titled demo EP by American progressive metal band The Human Abstract and was released in 2005. According to the biography on the band by Stewart Mason on the site allmusic.com, "the Human Abstract recorded a demo and played a number of regional gigs before signing with the local indie Hopeless Records in 2005".

The demo was produced by Jonny Santos of Spineshank and Silent Civilian and Logan Mader formerly of Machine Head, Soulfly, and Medication.

The songs "Meperidine Cathedral" (as "Movement from Discord") and "Winter Fevers" (as "Polaris") would later be re-recorded for the band's debut album, Nocturne.

Track listing

Personnel
 Nick Olaerts – lead vocals
 A. J. Minette – lead guitar
 Dean Herrera – rhythm guitar, backing vocals
 Kenny Arehart – bass
 Brett Powell – drums

References 

2005 debut EPs
The Human Abstract (band) albums
Demo albums